Socha is a surname of Slavic origin. It means statue in Czech and sokha in Polish.
Socha is the surname of the following people:
Aleksandra Socha (born 1982), Polish sabre fencer
Alexandra Socha (born 1990), American actress 
Bartłomiej Socha (born 1981), Polish football player
David Socha (born 1938), American association football referee 
Ireneusz Socha (born 1964), Polish drummer and composer
John Socha (born 1958), American software developer
John Stewart Socha, American radio broadcaster and journalist
Lauren Socha (born 1990), English actress
Leopold Socha (1909–1946), Polish sewage inspector 
Małgorzata Socha (born 1980), Polish actress
Michael Socha (born 1987), English actor, brother of Lauren
 (born 1981), Polish animated film director
Paweł Socha (bishop) (born 1935), Polish Roman Catholic bishop 
Paweł Socha (footballer) (born 1985), Polish football goalkeeper 
Tadeusz Socha (born 1988), Polish football defender 
Vladimír Socha (born 1982), Czech writer, publisher, public lecturer and science promoter 
Brett O. Socha (born 1986), American entrepreneur, process engineer, published author

Polish-language surnames
Czech-language surnames